Mark Isaac Friedman (born December 25, 1995) is a Canadian professional ice hockey defenceman, currently playing for the  Pittsburgh Penguins of the National Hockey League (NHL). He was selected in the 3rd round the 2014 NHL Entry Draft by the Philadelphia Flyers, the 86th overall pick of the draft. Prior to turning professional, Friedman played for the Bowling Green Falcons for three seasons where he was named to the WCHA All-Rookie Team and First Team All-WCHA.

Early life 
Friedman was born on December 25, 1995, in Toronto, Ontario, to parents Jeff and Joanne Friedman. Ice hockey ran in Friedman's family: when his father and uncle played minor ice hockey, they had been coached by Friedman's grandfather. Friedman began ice skating around the age of three and began playing hockey soon afterwards. He frequently ran into trouble at school, and he was known among his peers for his competitive nature in athletic competitions. Friedman referred to himself as "a pretty feisty guy growing up", in part because he was physically smaller than many of his teammates and "had to stand out somehow".

Friedman spent his adolescence in the Greater Toronto Hockey League (GTHL) with the Don Mills Flyers, the same team for whom his father and uncle had played. During the 2009–10 season, Friedman and the Flyers captured the Kraft Cup for the GTHL's regular-season champions.  That season, he scored 20 goals and 64 points in 85 games while recording 125 penalty minutes. While still playing for Don Mills, Friedman joined the North York Rangers of the Ontario Junior Hockey League (OJHL) for two games during their 2010-11 season. The following season, he joined the Rangers in full, where he led the team's defencemen in scoring with nine goals and 27 points in 48 regular-season games. He added an additional goal and three assists in four postseason OJHL games.

Playing career

Junior 
Friedman played for the Waterloo Blackhawks of the USHL in 2012–14. In 2014, he was named USHL Second All-Star Team.

He was selected in the 3rd round the 2014 NHL Entry Draft by the Philadelphia Flyers, the 86th overall pick of the draft.

NCAA 
Prior to turning professional, Friedman played for the Bowling Green Falcons for three seasons on a full hockey scholarship. At the conclusion of his freshman year, Friedman was named to the WCHA All-Rookie Team and the Falcons' co-Rookie of the Year. Following his successful freshman campaign, Friedman was invited to the Flyers prospect and development camp before the 2015–16 season. In his sophomore season, Friedman was named to the First Team All-WCHA.

Professional

Philadelphia Flyers 
Friedman signed an entry-level contract with the Flyers on March 21, 2017. He was reassigned to their American Hockey League affiliate, the Lehigh Valley Phantoms.

He made his NHL debut on April 6, 2019, vs. the Carolina Hurricanes. On this date Friedman became the second Jewish player in Flyers history.

In July 2020, Friedman and the Flyers agreed to a two-year, one-way contract extension, with an average annual value of $725,000. Remaining on the Flyers roster for the pandemic delayed 2020–21 season, Friedman made 4 appearances from the blueline before he was placed on waivers on February 23, 2021. On the following day, Friedman was claimed by Flyers' division rival, the Pittsburgh Penguins, under the influence of the newly hired and former Flyers general manager, Ron Hextall.

Pittsburgh Penguins 
On February 24, 2021, Pittsburgh Penguins general manager Ron Hextall announced that they had claimed Friedman off of waivers. He scored his first NHL goal against his former team in an eventual 4–3 loss and left the game early after a hit from Nolan Patrick. Since joining the Penguins, Friedman has been vocal in his preference of Pittsburgh over Philadelphia, calling Philadelphia noisy and dirty.

Personal life
Friedman is Jewish. His paternal grandfather, Mark Friedman (for whom he was named), played golf for the University of Miami.

Career statistics

Awards and honors

See also
List of select Jewish ice hockey players

References

External links

1995 births
21st-century Canadian Jews
Bowling Green Falcons men's ice hockey players
Canadian ice hockey defencemen
Jewish Canadian sportspeople
Jewish ice hockey players
Lehigh Valley Phantoms players
Living people
Philadelphia Flyers draft picks
Philadelphia Flyers players
Pittsburgh Penguins players
Ice hockey people from Toronto
Waterloo Black Hawks players
Wilkes-Barre/Scranton Penguins players